Krogan are a fictional alien race from the Mass Effect video game series.

Krogan may also refer to:
 Krogan, a character from Isle of Forgotten Sins
 Krogan, a character from DreamWorks Dragons

People with the surname 
 Nevan Krogan, a molecular biologist

Fictional
 Rachel and Stan Krogan, characters from The Story of Us